Carl Marcy (1913-1990) was the former Chief of Staff of the United States Senate Foreign Relations Committee.

Marcy was born in Oregon. He graduated from Willamette University, then completed a degree in law from Columbia University and a doctorate in Columbia University in international law and relations.

He received a Rockefeller Public Service Award in 1963, and with his wife Mildred Kester Marcy received a Joint Fellowship from the Institute of Current World Affairs, which allowed them to travel and live abroad for two years to research US foreign policy concerns.

References 

Political chiefs of staff
Employees of the United States Senate
Willamette University alumni
Columbia Law School alumni
United States congressional aides
1913 births
1990 deaths